Richard Dumbrill may refer to:

Richard Dumbrill (cricketer)
Richard Dumbrill (musicologist)